The Yellow Pawn is a lost 1916 American drama silent film directed by George Melford and written by Frederic Arnold Kummer and Margaret Turnbull. The film stars Wallace Reid, Cleo Ridgely, William Conklin, Tom Forman, Irene Aldwyn and Clarence Geldart. The film was released on November 23, 1916, by Paramount Pictures.

Plot

Cast 
Wallace Reid as James Weldon
Cleo Ridgely as Kate Turner
William Conklin as Allen Perry
Tom Forman as Philip Grant
Irene Aldwyn as Marian Turner
Clarence Geldart as Mr. Turner 
George Webb as Tom Weldon
George Kuwa as Sen Yat

References

External links 
 
 
 

1916 films
1910s English-language films
Silent American drama films
1916 drama films
Lost American films
Paramount Pictures films
Films directed by George Melford
American black-and-white films
American silent feature films
1916 lost films
Lost drama films
1910s American films